Cataloipus cymbiferus is a West African species of grasshopper in the family Acrididae. In Mali, it is a pest that frequently attacks the pearl millet.

References 

 https://web.archive.org/web/20131110030827/http://zipcodezoo.com/Animals/C/Cataloipus_cymbiferus/
 AcridAfrica, liste espèces A-H

External links
 Names in Dogon languages, with images from Mali

Acrididae
Orthoptera of Africa
Insects described in 1877
Agricultural pest insects
Insect pests of millets